Darren Tinson (born 15 November 1969) is a former professional footballer. The defender has played for Colwyn Bay, Northwich Victoria, Macclesfield Town, Shrewsbury Town, Burton Albion, Altrincham and Leek Town over his career.

Tinson left Northwich to join Macclesfield Town for £10,000 in February 1996. He was part of the Macclesfield Town side which gained promotion to the Football League and then moved on a free transfer to Shrewsbury Town where he again won promotion to the League before joining Burton Albion from 1 August 2005. After two seasons at Burton Albion, he joined Altrincham in May 2007. Darren was captain of Altrincham for the 2007–08 season, making 51 appearances in all.

Darren had been expected to continue playing for Altrincham in the 2008–09 season. However, he elected to join fellow ex-Northwich defender Steve Davis's team Nantwich Town in the Northern Premier League. He was appointed joint manager of the club in 2010. On 10 March 2011 it was announced that along with joint manager Kevin Street he was leaving by mutual consent.

He later joined Leek Town
He studied at the University of Salford for a degree in Physiotherapy.

References

External links
 

1969 births
Living people
Association football defenders
People from Connah's Quay
Sportspeople from Flintshire
Northwich Victoria F.C. players
Macclesfield Town F.C. players
Shrewsbury Town F.C. players
Burton Albion F.C. players
Altrincham F.C. players
Colwyn Bay F.C. players
Nantwich Town F.C. players
Welsh footballers
English Football League players
National League (English football) players
Alumni of the University of Salford
Welsh football managers
Nantwich Town F.C. managers
Leek Town F.C. players
Northern Premier League players